Elysé Razafindrakoto (born 12 June 1974) is a retired Malagasy football defender.

References

1974 births
Living people
Malagasy footballers
Madagascar international footballers
AS Fortior players
USCA Foot players
Léopards de Transfoot players
Association football defenders